Adolf Šlár (14 February 1919 – 7 April 1987) was a male Czech international table tennis player.

Table tennis career
He won nine medals at the World Table Tennis Championships from 1935 to 1954. This included two gold medals  at the 1947 World Table Tennis Championships in the team event and in the men's doubles with Václav Tereba respectively.

He also won an English Open title.

Personal life
He was a Ministry of Foreign Trade official in Prague.

See also
 List of table tennis players
 List of World Table Tennis Championships medalists

References

Czech male table tennis players
1919 births
1987 deaths
Sportspeople from Prague
World Table Tennis Championships medalists